'Abd al-'Azim 'Anis (1923–2009) (Arabic: عبد العظيم انيس) was a leading Egyptian cultural critic and Marxist involved with the Communist Party of Egypt. 
He was detained in Egyptian prisons from the early 1960s due to his political activities. 'Anis called for "unity of all the nationalist and progressive forces including, naturally, the Arab communists."

His publications included essays and letters written in prison. He co-authored Fi al-Thaqafa al-Misriyya (On Egyptian Culture), first published in 1955, with Mahmoud Amin al-'Alim.

References 

1923 births
2009 deaths